Gordan Mihić (19 September 1938 – 11 August 2019) was a Serbian playwright best known for his work on movie scripts for Black Cat, White Cat, Time of the Gypsies, Balkan Express and for the TV series Otvorena vrata and Kamiondžije.

He was married to actress Vera Čukić with whom he had a daughter, also an actress. In 2021 Mihić was awarded Medal for Merits by the Republic of Serbia.

Filmography

References

External links
 

1938 births
2019 deaths
People from Mostar
Serbs of Bosnia and Herzegovina
Serbian dramatists and playwrights
Serbian screenwriters
Male screenwriters
Golden Arena winners
Burials at Serbian Orthodox monasteries and churches